Dayviews (formerly Bilddagboken, "picture diary") is a Swedish virtual community where users can upload photographs and present these to other members. The community has succeeded well on the virtual community market in Sweden, primarily because the site is aimed entirely at sharing images, while other communities in Sweden are mostly aimed at chatting. The page is, according to themselves, Sweden's largest and fastest growing website. 
(Statistics about Swedish commercial websites is available at Kiaindex – )

The page has about 20,000 to 80,000 members logged in at any given time and about six million visitors (one million unique visitors) per week (July 2008).

On 15 October 2007 it was confirmed that Lunarstorm had bought 40% of Bilddagboken.

On 14 June 2008, the community surpassed more than 200 million uploaded images. It also reached 800,000 members in the same week.

In October 2008, Bilddagboken had more than 100,000 users logged in at the same time, setting a record for itself. This effectively overloaded the servers and caused slow surfing at their site. Recently, Bilddagboken has also created a new forum for all users.

As of 2008, Bilddagboken is available in 5 different languages (see below).

The Bilddagboken sister sites have been 'live' for almost 2 years and have failed to capture any presence within International markets.

Bilddagboken.se and Myphotodiary.com are the same site since November 2009, with a link to change language in the footer of the page, although only Swedish and English are available at this time. The other localizations are still separate sites.

References

External links
Bilddagboken.se 
Bildedagboka.no 
Kuvapaivakirja.fi 
Billeddagbog.dk 
Instagram Profile Viewer
Myphotodiary.com 

Swedish social networking websites
Imageboards